Valmorbida is a surname. Notable people with the surname include:

Andy Valmorbida, Australian art dealer
Elise Valmorbida, Australian writer